

Dagger

Dagoth

Dagoth is a demon who has clashed with Doctor Strange.

Daken

Dakimh the Enchanter
Dakimh, is described as a wise but eccentric wizard that lived in pre-cataclysmic Atlantis, and was the pupil of the sorceress Zhered-Na. Zhered-Na was banished from Atlantis by King Kamuu for prophesying that the continent would sink below the ocean.  She started her own cult, took her favored disciple Dakimh, and greatly extended his life span so that he aged at an extremely slow rate. While Zhered-Na perished, Dakimh survived the cataclysm that sunk Atlantis and escaped, continuing to live for centuries and maintaining the teachings of his mentor as her only surviving disciple.

Damballah

Daniel Whitehall
Daniel Whitehall is a British intelligence agent also known as the Kraken.

An elite assassin and member of the terrorist organization Hydra also used the name and debuted in Secret Warriors #2 (March 2009). Writer/artist Jonathan Hickman stated in an interview with Comic Book Resources that "Kraken" is a new character. The other Hydra character with that name [Commander Kraken] was "a real b-list character and pretty lame. Our Kraken... has a long and elaborate history and we're going to be delving into that in a major way". Kraken is a legendary Hydra agent, whose existence had been unverifiable, until recently. Any S.H.I.E.L.D. agents that tried to find documented proof all disappeared. The Kraken preferred to work behind the scenes, seeing it as his mission to help people become what they are meant to be, usually with dangerous results. For decades he was responsible for developing Hydra's best assets, training their best talent. This involved a lot of human trafficking, theft, and murder. He was the head of the school that trained orphaned girls (including a young Viper) into human weapons. The current Kraken is actually the second Kraken not Daniel Whitehall, having stolen the original's identity by taking his equipment and reading his journals.

It is revealed that this second Kraken is actually Jake Fury, who had infiltrated the highest rungs of HYDRA to help his brother bring about its destruction.

Daniel Whitehall in other media
 Daniel Whitehall appears in season two of the live-action Marvel Cinematic Universe television series Agents of S.H.I.E.L.D., portrayed by Reed Diamond. This version originally went by the name Werner Reinhardt and was a member of Hydra in 1945, prior to being arrested by Peggy Carter and the Strategic Scientific Reserve. In 1989, an elderly Reinhardt was freed from life imprisonment by Hydra infiltrators within S.H.I.E.L.D. and encounters Jiaying, an Inhuman woman whom he encountered during WWII and has not aged since. He dissected her in an attempt to find out why this was and transplanted her abilities to himself; restoring him to his WWII age and unknowingly becoming the target of Jiaying's husband, Calvin Zabo's, revenge. In the present, Reinhardt took the name "Daniel Whitehall" and took over as Hydra's North American leader. He also leads an effort to acquire a Kree artifact called the "Diviner" and utilizes Johann Fenhoff's work to brainwash people into Hydra's service, during which Whitehall clashes with a S.H.I.E.L.D. team led by Phil Coulson. Whitehall is eventually killed by Coulson, depriving Zabo of his revenge. Whitehall also makes minor appearances in flashbacks in the season three episode "Paradise Lost" and the season five episode "Rise and Shine".
 An image of Reed Diamond used to represent Daniel Whitehall appears in Avengers: Endgame.

Dansen Macabre
Dansen Macabre is an exotic dancer and a devoted worshipper of the God Shiva. She first appeared in Marvel Team-Up #93 (May 1980). She used her powers to hypnotize Spider-Man into battling The Shroud in an attempt to kill both of them. The pair managed to overcome her dances and defeat her. She briefly appeared later as a captive of Locksmith, but was saved by Spider-Woman. Eventually, the Shroud invited her to join the Night Shift, which she accepted and became co-leader. She served in several missions, mainly going up against the Avengers. She took some time out to work with Superia and the Femizons as they battled Captain America.

Dansen Macabre and the rest of Night Shift are hired by Snapdragon to kill Moon Knight on behalf of Count Nefaria who was operating as the Kingpin of Los Angeles. When they fail and are bailed out of prison by Snapdragon's lawyer, Count Nefaria reduces Dansen Macabre, Digger, Needle, Tatterdemalion, Tick Tock, and Misfit to ashes.

During the "Spider-Geddon" storyline, Dansen and Digger turn up alive as they, Brothers Grimm, Skein, and new member Waxman rob a bus of people only to be thwarted by Superior Octopus where his goggles tuned out Dansen's hypnotism. Superior Octopus agrees to spare them more pain in exchange that the Night Shift becomes his paid agents. They agree to the terms and are ordered to return the stolen items. Superior Octopus leaves advising them never to cross him or they won't live long enough to regret it.

Dansen Macabre has the mystical ability to hypnotize or kill anyone who witnesses her dancing. She can also make herself undetectable by human senses.

Randall Darby

Daredevil

Dark Beast

Dark-Crawler
The Dark-Crawler, formerly known as the Night-Crawler, is a large extradimensional humanoid being with a tail. He is originally from a "dark dimension" (not related to Dormammu's dimension). He later became master of the Undying Ones' dimension after defeating the Nameless One.

Dark Phoenix

Darkdevil

Darkhawk

Darkoth

Darkstar

Darter
Darter (Randy Vale) is a minor villain in Marvel Comics. The character, created by Bill Mantlo and Jim Mooney, first appeared in Peter Parker, the Spectacular Spider-Man #29 (April 1979).

Randy Vale was an undergraduate at Empire State University. One day, Randy accidentally stumbled across a clone casket that once belonged to Miles Warren. The casket opened to reveal a decayed clone named Carrion. Upon learning of his creator's death, Carrion offered a partnership with Randy to get revenge on Spider-Man. In return, Randy was offered "power", but it was not specified what exactly that power would entail. Randy donned a high tech uniform and went by the name Darter. As Darter, Randy could glide through the air and fire lasers at his enemies. His first fight was with White Tiger who he actually managed to knock down. Later, the two would fight again in the gymnasium where Spider-Man and Carrion were fighting. When Carrion fled with Spider-Man, Randy realized that he was betrayed by his master and swore revenge on Carrion. He encountered his master while he was trying to drain the life from Spider-Man. Randy tried to attack Carrion, but he was hit with the red death causing him to rapidly deteriorate and die.

Darter in other media
Randy Vale appears in Spider-Man: Homecoming, portrayed by Christopher Berry. This version is an employee of Adrian Toomes' salvaging company. When Toomes' company goes out of business following the Department of Damage Control's formation years prior, Toomes and his employees turn to crime. In the present, Vale is subdued by Spider-Man.

Darwin

Spacker Dave

Jefferson Davis

Jefferson Davis, also known as Jeff Morales, is the father of Miles Morales / Spider-Man. The character was created by Brian Michael Bendis and Sara Pichelli, and first appeared in Ultimate Comics Spider-Man #1 (November 2011) as part of Marvel Comics' Ultimate Marvel line of books set in a universe and continuity separate from the "mainstream" Marvel Universe.

Jefferson is an African-American man who is married to the Puerto Rican Rio Morales. He never got along with his criminal brother Aaron Davis. Things got out of control and Jefferson wound up in jail only to be bailed out by Nick Fury. Impressed with his fighting skills, Fury had Jefferson join gangster Turk Barrett's gang for intel, eventually working his way up to Wilson Fisk's criminal empire. Afterwards, Jefferson was offered a spot in S.H.I.E.L.D. by Fury but chose to live a simple life of being a husband to Rio and father to Miles. Jefferson kept Miles from ever interacting with Aaron and keeping a strict household in an attempt to lead his son on a clean path. Despite his overall dislike of Aaron's criminal activities, Jefferson was saddened by his brother's death.

During the events of United We Stand, Jefferson was arrested by S.H.I.E.L.D. only to be attacked by Hydra who attempt to get Jefferson to join, but he kills his would-be recruiters and returns home to Rio. He tells his wife what happens and they go looking for Miles, finding their son at Ganke Lee's house. Jefferson is later attacked by Conrad Marcus, putting him in the hospital. He's attacked again, but Spider-Man battles and defeats Venom at the cost of Rio's life. One year later, Jefferson discovered that Miles is Spider-Man, angering him and blaming his son for the deaths of Aaron and Rio. Jefferson apologizes and reveals his own past to his son. Jefferson's undercover life impressed both Donald Roxxon and the Green Goblin.

After the events of Secret Wars, Molecule Man thanks Miles by transferring him, Ganke and both their families to the mainstream Marvel Universe, with Jefferson being reunited with Rio, who is restored to life. As they retain their memories from their original universe, restored by Gwen Poole, he and Rio learn from Miles that Aaron was also resurrected when their families (alongside most of Miles' friends) were transferred to the main universe.

Alternate versions of Jefferson Davis
In the Spider-Gwen reality, the character is the Scorpion. Instead of a green suit with a large tail, he wears an electrically-charged suit and tie and wields a staff resembling a scorpion tail. Additionally, he works for the criminal organization S.I.L.K.

Jefferson Davis in other media
 Jefferson Davis appears in Spider-Man (2017), voiced by Alex Désert. Introduced in the first season, he is initially optimistic and has a healthy relationship with Miles Morales. In the third season, Jefferson's desire to protect his neighborhood leads to him becoming Swarm, gaining the use of purple nanotech bees that can use their stingers to brainwash humans, forming an alliance with the Jackal, and using various formulas to amass an army of mutants for the "Underground Monster League", an underground gladiatorial arena-based streaming show for the criminal underworld before it is dismantled by the Spider-Team. Jefferson later confronts the Ultimate Spider-Man on the Dark Goblin's behalf, but both combatants learn each other's secret identities. Realizing the error of his ways, Jefferson flees in shock.
 Jefferson Davis appears in Spider-Man: Into the Spider-Verse, voiced by Brian Tyree Henry. This version is a PDNY officer who has a healthy relationship with Miles Morales, but has high expectations of the latter. Additionally, Jefferson is initially unaware of Aaron Davis's criminal career as the Prowler, but is still not keen on Miles spending time with his brother. After Aaron is killed by the Kingpin, the distraught Jefferson initially believes his brother's killer to be the new Spider-Man. He reconciles with Miles, unknowingly inspiring him to become the new Spider-Man and avenge Aaron by defeating the Kingpin. Following the Kingpin's defeat and arrest, Jefferson accepts the new Spider-Man's heroic efforts.
 Jefferson Davis appears in Insomniac Games's Spider-Man series, voiced by Russell Richardson. This version is a NYPD officer.
 Introduced in Marvel's Spider-Man (2018), Jefferson aids in the original Spider-Man's investigation into the Kingpin's abandoned assets and preventing them from falling into Mister Negative's hands on Captain Yuri Watanabe's behalf. After rescuing Spider-Man and receiving public recognition for it, Jefferson and his family attend Norman Osborn's mayoral reelection rally, where Jefferson is lauded for his heroism until Mister Negative and the Inner Demons launch a terrorist attack, during which Jefferson sacrifices himself to save another officer from a suicide bomber. Miles Morales eventually comes to terms with his father's death with help from Rio Morales and accepts Peter Parker's offer to work as a part-timer at a F.E.A.S.T. Center to cope with the loss further and honor his father's legacy.
 In Spider-Man: Miles Morales, it is revealed Jefferson had been estranged from his brother Aaron after discovering he was the Prowler. Jefferson agreed not to arrest Aaron, but demanded his brother stay away from his family. The brothers never reconciled before Jefferson's death, leaving Aaron deeply affected and overprotective of the second Spider-Man. Jefferson also makes a vocal cameo in a flashback in the main story and a side mission.
 Jeff Morales appears in Spidey and His Amazing Friends, voiced by Eugene Byrd.

Leonardo da Vinci

Leonardo da Vinci is a fictional character based on the Italian polymath of the same name. He was created by Carl Wessler and Bob Forgione and first appeared in Astonishing #54.

Leonardo was born in Vinci, as the son of Caterina and Piero Fruosino di Antonio da Vinci. He was one of the thinkers spawned by the Renaissance, and became one of the most important polymaths of that era. He had also worked on other projects, including the Steam Engine. During this time, he had joined the Brotherhood of the Shield, which were a group of other geniuses, including: Sir Isaac Newton, Imhotep, Zhang Heng, and Galileo Galilei. This group were the first heroes to defeat the Brood, Galactus, and the Celestials. After witnessing some dark spot growing on the sun, Leonardo along with his two assistants, built a suit capable of flight and went to deal with these dark spots.

After that, he was approached by a messenger from K'un-Lun to ask Leonardo for help in training Fongji Wu, the next Iron Fist, who would become the host of the Phoenix Force. He along with Yu-Ti and Lei-Kung were successful in manifesting the Phoenix Force within Fongji. They then constructed a telescope to watch the arrival of the Phoenix and giving Leonardo an opportunity to study it.

Leonardo eventually was able to time travel and left a robot to impersonate him in his mortal life. He travelled to the 1960s, where he was confronted by the new leader of the Shield, Leonid, the son of Isaac Newton and the Deviant Morda. Leonid promised that he would rescue all things, but came to a disagreement with Isaac who had become the undying leader of the group.

During this time, Leonardo formed the organization known as the Great Wheel of Zodiac, with its members including:  Vasili Dassaiev, John Garrett, Shoji Soma, Cornelius van Lunt, Baron Strucker, Dum Dum Dugan, Nick Fury, Jake Fury, Daniel Whitehall, Viktor Uvarov, and Thomas Davidson, with each member being codenamed after a sign of the zodiac. However, the organization fell apart, which led to the creation of S.H.I.E.L.D., Hydra, Leviathan, and the Zodiac Cartel. Leonardo then stated that the reason for forming the organization was to control its members.

Leonardo was then seen as a technical adviser of S.H.I.E.L.D., after the dismantling of H.A.M.M.E.R., and was seen again after the Secret Empire storyline, where he had gathered different geniuses to build a new organization that would replace S.H.I.E.L.D.

 Other versions
In What If?: Nick Fury fought World War II in space, the Leonardo da Vinci of this reality not only designed his projects, but actually built them. Thanks to his legacy, the Human race was able to reach the stars in the early 1900s.

During the 2015 Secret Wars, a version of Leonardo appears as a member of the Hel-Rangers, a team composed of people who had been exiled for their crimes against the Shield. Leonardo would spend most of his time building technology for the Hel-Rangers to use against those who attacked the Shield. During the end of the event, Leonardo revealed to the Thing that he had built the Enlightenment Cannon which was fueled by Michelangelo's power. After the death of his friend, Michelangelo, and the discovery about the truth of life, Leonardo committed suicide.

A version of Leonardo appears attacking Madison Jeffries and Broo during the Science Battle between the Avengers and X-Men.

Daytripper

Dazzler

The Deacon
The Deacon is a zealot who believes he is doing the work of God. He has been blessed with powers and weapons from Heaven. His sole weakness is that he will not destroy any holy object such as the Bible.

Dead Girl

Deadpool

Demon Bear
The Demon Bear is a character appearing in The New Mutants and X-Force, as well as appearing as the secondary antagonist of the 2020 film The New Mutants. Its powers include Teleportation, super strength, shapeshifting, negative emotion empowerment, and corruption of human souls.

Betty Dean
Betty Dean Prentiss is a fictional character from Marvel Comics. A policewoman, she was a supporting character of Namor and Namora in the Golden Age published by Timely Comics. First appearing in Marvel Mystery Comics #3 (January 1940), Betty Dean was one of the earliest recurring characters / romantic interests in Marvel Comics. She often advocates compassion for air breathers to Namor and urges him to help the Allies battle the Nazis. Betty was a key figure in Marvel's first crossover Marvel Mystery Comics #8-#10 where she helped Namor and the Human Torch come to terms after battling each other. Midway through World War II, she becomes a reporter whose scoops often lead Namor to adventures. After WWII, she reunited with Namor for several adventures in the 1950s Atlas Comics. Betty eventually married and became Betty Dean Prentiss, after Namor returned to Atlantis. In the Silver Age, at Namor's request, the widowed Betty became the guardian for his young cousin, Namorita, during her surface world education. Betty was transformed into a green scaled amphibian by Namor foe Dr. Hydro. She was killed by Doctor Dorcas saving Namor in Marvel Super-Villain Team-Up #2 (October 1975).

Frank and Leslie Dean

Death

Personification

Sanjar Javeed

Death Adder

Roland Burroughs

Theodore Scott

Death-Dealer
Death-Dealer (Li Ching-Lin) is a fictional supervillain and an enemy of Shang-Chi appearing in American comic books published by Marvel Comics. Created by Doug Moench and Gene Day, he first appeared in Master of Kung Fu #115 (Aug. 1982).

Li Ching-Lin is an MI6 agent known for his extremely brutal methods who was also working as a double agent for the criminal mastermind Zheng Zu, Shang-Chi's father. When Shang-Chi and MI6 discover Li's true allegiance, Li flees from them and rendezvouses with Zheng Zu at his secret base in London, where he is given the name "Death-Dealer", provided with a masked costume and weapons, and ordered to eliminate Shang-Chi and his allies. Death-Dealer succeeds in capturing Shang-Chi and brings him to Zheng Zu. Despite his weakened state, Shang-Chi is able to escape capture and defeats Death-Dealer in combat. With their London base destroyed, Death-Dealer and Zheng Zu escape by helicopter to Zheng Zu's fortress in China.

When Shang-Chi arrives at Zheng Zu's fortress, Death-Dealer is dispatched to take Shang-Chi's blood for Zheng Zu to preserve his longevity. Shang-Chi throws a brazier at him, which burns him to death.

Years later, Death-Dealer's son Huo Li confronted Shang-Chi to avenge his father's death, but was easily defeated by the Master of Kung Fu.

Powers and abilities
Li Ching-Lin is an excellent hand-to-hand fighter.

Death-Dealer in other media
Death-Dealer appears in the live-action Marvel Cinematic Universe film Shang-Chi and the Legend of the Ten Rings, portrayed by Andy Le. This version is a member of the Ten Rings, serves under its leader Wenwu, and personally trained Shang-Chi through cruel measures. Death-Dealer, Razor Fist, and a group of Ten Rings members travel to Macau to claim Xialing's pendant, only to encounter and fight Shang-Chi until Wenwu stops the fight. Death-Dealer later accompanies the Ten Rings to the village of Ta Lo, where he is eventually killed by the Dweller-in-Darkness' minions.

Death Metal

Death-Stalker
The first Death-Stalker was Philip Wallace Sterling. An enemy of Daredevil, he first appeared as the Exterminator in Daredevil #39 (April 1968); he first appeared as Death-Stalker in Daredevil #113 (September 1974).

Fictional character biography

Philip Wallace Sterling was born in Riverdale, Bronx, New York. He was a wealthy man prior to embarking on a career as a professional criminal. When he first appeared as the Exterminator, he recruited the Unholy Three. He constructed a "time displacer ray" ("t-ray") which could teleport its target into another dimension (possibly the Limbo from which Immortus hails). The Exterminator led the Unholy Three in a series of criminal activities and battled Daredevil. When Daredevil defeated the Exterminator and his agents, he also destroyed the t-ray, accidentally bombarding the Exterminator with its strange energy and seemingly killing him.

Sterling found himself trapped between two dimensions, able to return to Earth at will but only for a few hours at a time; furthermore, the mutation caused his skin to become chalk-white. He stole a pair of gloves from A.I.M. that gave him a "death-grip," and began calling himself Death-Stalker.  He tried several times to kill Daredevil and build a new t-ray machine, but most of his battles with Daredevil ended in a draw.

He was allied with the Gladiator against Daredevil. Death-Stalker traveled to the Florida Everglades in search of papers relating to Ted Sallis' experiments and encountered the Man-Thing. He later stole a set of ancient Lemurian mirror lenses from various museums and used them to create a powerful gun to destroy Daredevil. However, Daredevil destroyed the gun, and in the midst of their battle, Death-Stalker was mysteriously discorporated by the Sky-Walker. He reappeared in a third costumed guise as the second Death's-Head, gifting an enforcer called the Smasher with superhuman strength and kidnapping Karen Page to force her to give him the original Death's Head's research. He was defeated by Daredevil and Ghost Rider, killing the Smasher with his touch during the battle.

Sterling resumed the Death-Stalker identity and assembled a large gathering of criminals to take part in an undisclosed theft, presumably of t-ray components. Daredevil found out about the gathering and in the resulting confrontation Death-Stalker touched (and thus killed) one of his underlings, frightening the others away. Seeing no point in battling Daredevil at this time, he teleported away. Angered at this latest interference with his plans, he created another Smasher and sent him to kill Daredevil. The new Smasher failed and Daredevil refused to imprison him, knowing that Death-Stalker would have entered the prison and killed him for his failure. Turning to a new plan, he stole a newly developed scientific apparatus from Stark International.

Death-Stalker attempted to kill Daredevil while the crime-fighter was hospitalized, but was stopped by the Avengers. He created a new Unholy Three and had them kidnap Matt Murdock, whose secret identity as Daredevil he had learned by observation from between dimensions. Daredevil was taken to St. Stephens Cemetery, where Death-Stalker killed two of the Unholy Three and attacked Daredevil. Unable to overcome Death-Stalker's superior abilities, Daredevil knocked out the nearby street light, thus enclosing the cemetery in darkness. Fighting blindly, Death-Stalker rematerialized while his body was phasing through a tombstone, which killed him instantly.

Death-Stalker was, for a brief time, survived by his mother, Elizabeth Dawes Sterling. Lying on her deathbed, and in her hatred for Daredevil for the death of her son, she had her house converted into a deathtrap and built child-like androids fitted with self-destruct devices constructed to lure him to his demise. However, Daredevil just barely managed to escape her deadly revenge. Elizabeth herself died before Daredevil could be lured into the trap.

Villains for Hire
A new female Death-Stalker appeared in the first issue of Villains for Hire (the villain counterpart of Heroes for Hire). This Death-Stalker's true identity is unknown. She is among the villains hired by Purple Man to help him start his new criminal empire. Death-Stalker was almost shot in the head by Crossbones and shrugs to him by stating "you can't kill what is already dead." Death-Stalker later survives the explosion of the boat she was on.

Powers and abilities
Accidental exposure to an overdose of "t-radiation" altered Sterling's physiology, making it so that he normally existed in a dimension congruent to Earth. While in this realm, he could watch and listen to events on Earth without being observed from Earth by any means. By willing himself to do so, he could shift into the Earth dimension to varying degrees. He could become visible but intangible, or visible and tangible as he desired. He could shift from one state to the other instantaneously. Also, while completely in his interdimensional state, he could cover distances more rapidly, enabling him to disappear from one Earth location and reappear at another far sooner than if he had traversed that same distance on Earth. Death-Stalker could not continuously manifest in the dimension of Earth for more than several hours at a time. His "cybernetic death-grip" devices, stolen from A.I.M., was worn in his gloves, which emitted a dose of microwave radiation when activated by mental command, crippling or killing (depending on the duration of contact) any living creature who came into contact with it. This self-described "touch of death" energy has been described as microwaves, but seems to have properties of both lightning and truly intense cold. Death-Stalker, however, had to materialize tangibly, and in full, on Earth for the device to be effective — a "lone weakness" which Daredevil learned he could exploit to attack Sterling. On several occasions Death-Stalker also appeared to possess superhuman strength, although its extent is unknown and it is unclear whether it was a physical ability (via his radiation mutated form) or via his cybernetic death-grip devices. All in all, Philip Wallace Sterling was a brilliant criminal mastermind — running a global "espionage syndicate" — in addition to being an accomplished inventor and scientist with extensive knowledge of advanced scientific apparatus.

Death Wreck
Death Wreck was created by Craig Houston and Stewart "Staz" Johnson. He first appeared in Death Wreck #1 (January 1994). Death Wreck is a cyborg, a prototype built by A.I.M. scientist Doctor Evelyn Necker in 2018 as part of the Minion project. Constructed at short notice and considered entirely expendable, Death Wreck contains the "brain of a wino" housed within a body powered by a car engine.

Death's-Head

Deathbird

Deathlok

Luther Manning

John Kelly

Michael Collins

Jack Truman/Larry Young

Deathlok Prime

Death Locket

Henry Hayes

Jemma Simmons

Deathurge
Deathurge is a former servant of Maelstrom.

Deathwatch

Debrii

December
December (Winter Frost) is a mutant in X-Nation 2099. In the year 2099, a young girl named Winter Frost, like many teenagers, got a job at a local amusement park. But Million Palms Amusement Park was not like others, it actually had a king and a queen who presided over it. One day Queen Perigrine disappeared, and they found her body at the bottom of the Tunnel of Love. After that day, King Avian began to be suspicious of everyone and required genetic scans of all incoming tourist before they could enter. Anyone with genetic anomalies was imprisoned in an underground labyrinth and subjected to many tests and acts of torture. Winter was discovered to be a mutant and was imprisoned like many others. December is capable of drastically lowering the air temperature surrounding her hands and projecting it outwards to freeze the air around her into arctic gale winds, allowing her to flash freeze or freeze dry objects in her surroundings.

Defender
Defender (real name Don Stevens) is a superhero who appeared on the cover of the first issue of U.S.A. Comics and in stories from issues #2-4.

Valentina Allegra de Fontaine

Father Delgado

Father Francis Xavier Delgado is a fictional priest in Marvel Comics. The character, created by Bill Mantlo and Rick Leonardi, first appeared in Cloak and Dagger #1 (October 1983).

Father Delgado preached at the Holy Ghost Church, which was located in the slums of Hell's Kitchen. He arrived at his church one day to find Cloak and Dagger, who came seeking sanctuary. After hearing their story, he chose to honor their wishes of being discreet and fed and housed them. He even led away police detective Brigid O'Reilly and defended them from the police. His church has acted as their superhero base of sorts and he has aided other superheroes like Spider-Man and the New Mutants. Later, Delgado accompanies Cloak and Dagger to visit Dagger's mother, Melissa Bowen. When she turns out to be cruel and uncaring, Dagger blights her and returns to Cloak and Delgado. Delgado is shown to detest Cloak and Dagger's vigilante efforts, but cannot stand to see them leave, particularly Dagger as he wants to "rescue" her from Cloak's "demonic" life. The duo, along with the newly transformed Brigid, who had become Mayhem, rescue Delgado from criminals who were posing as a religious group.

While thankful for being rescued, Delgado still feared that Cloak and Dagger's souls were corrupted by demons. Both the congregation and Daimon Hellstrom refuse to perform an exorcism for him, so he attempts to do so himself. He is stopped by Mayhem who ridicules him for his selfishness. Ashamed, Delgado prays. When Dagger returns to the church, Delgado confronts Cloak and forces him to leave with holy water. His actions inadvertently awaken the Predator, the demon responsible for Cloak's hunger, and resurrect the spirit of Jack the Ripper. When Dagger learns that Delgado turned Cloak away, she angrily leaves him. Delgado is later taken away to a psychiatric hospital by the congregation. He is placed in a padded cell and tells Mayhem that he has lost his faith. Dagger later visits Delgado and learns that he appears to be sane; however, it is quickly revealed that he is under the control of Mister Jip, who is keeping him alive and who he sees as his God. He is visited by Dagger's uncle, Michael Bowen, who has replaced Delgado at the Holy Ghost Church. As the two pray together, Delgado secretly prays to Mister Jip and plots to kill Dagger, who he views as a temptress.

He soon leaves the hospital and tells Cloak that he is feeling better now, but in actuality he is working close with Mister Jip and his assistant Night. Delgado begins working for Michael Bowen and once again feigns sanity, even when he encounters a blind Dagger from whom he must restrain himself. While sweeping the church, Delgado is visited by Ecstasy. Feeling that this is part of a test by Mister Jip, Delgado lets slip where Dagger is. Thinking he has failed, Disciplinarian enters, looking for Ecstasy. Delgado tries to fight him off, but is shot. He recuperates in the hospital, but is convinced that he has failed the Lord due to Cloak and Dagger being together again. Dagger visits him and as she is thanking him for his bravery in protecting her, he continues to plot to kill her. He is eventually released and reports to Mister Jip about Cloak and Dagger. Mister Jip breaks his promise to Delgado and takes over his body, effectively killing him.

Father Delgado in other media
Father Delgado appears in Cloak & Dagger, portrayed by Jaime Zevallos. This version is a school counselor and priest at St. Sebastian's School. Unlike his comic book counterpart, Delgado is helpful, particularly with Tyrone, and tries to dissuade him from negative thoughts. In "Back Breaker", Delgado confronts Tyrone when he lashes out to one of his classmates. He attempts to analyze him by punishing him. When Tyrone tries to leave, he sees Delgado's fear of him having either killed, or potentially kill a child due to his hidden alcoholism. After that experience, Father Delgado quotes to Tyrone "just go". Following the Terrors incident, Father Delgado was seen at Tyrone's house with Tyrone's parents and the police. At the time when Mayhem visited him in the episode "Shadow Selves", Father Delgado was shown to have resigned as a school counselor. He tells Mayhem that he does not know where Tyrone is. Father Delgado was later seen doing his preaching on the streets. Adina visits Delgado and convinces him to be a priest again so that they can help Tyrone. She confesses that, as soon as she got proof of Tyrone's innocence, she killed Connors. After Tandy and Tyrone leave New Orleans, Father Delgado moves into the abandoned church.

Marco Delgado

Delilah

Delphi

Demiurge
Demiurge is a cosmic entity who created the Elder Gods.

Demogoblin

Demolition Man

Demon Bear

Desak

Destiny

Irene Adler

Destroyer

Keen Marlow

Asgard

Detroit Steel

Devastator

Kirov Petrovna

Gregori Larionov

Unnamed

Devil Dinosaur

Devil-Slayer

Devos the Devastator

Jean DeWolff

Diablo

Bob Diamond
Bob Diamond is a member of the Sons of the Tiger in the Marvel Universe. The character, created by Steve Englehart and Jim Starlin, first appeared in The Deadly Hands of Kung Fu #1 (April 1974). Within the context of the stories, Bob Diamond is a skilled martial artist and allies with Abe Brown, Lin Sun, Luke Cage, and Iron Fist.

Diamond Lil

Diamondback

Willis Stryker

Rachel Leighton

Debbie Bertrand

Diamondhead

Diatrice Alraune
Diatrice Alraune is a fictional character appearing in American comic books published by Marvel Comics. She is the daughter of Marc Spector and Marlene Alraune. The character first appeared in Moon Knight #190 (December, 2017), created by Max Bemis and Jacen Burrows.

Fictional character biography
After Marlene Alraune left her husband Eric Fontaine, she returned to Marc Spector, who once again operated as Moon Knight out of his Long Island Mansion. They stayed together for a while, but soon agreed to live separate lives, since Marc's lifestyle constantly endangered Marlene's life.

Sometime later, Marc reappeared to Marlene, this time in his Jake Lockley persona, and the two became romantically involved again, having conceived a daughter during this time. During her childhood, Marlene let her daughter change her name to whatever she liked, so she chose Diatrice. This was all hidden from Marc's other personalities, until Sun King and Bushman came to Marlene's house and discovered the truth, using this secret to manipulate Marc.

When Marc confronted Sun King and Bushman in Marlene's house, a fight broke out. The villains escaped during a moment Marc was distracted protecting Diatrice, taking Marlene with them. Marc took Diatrice to his apartment and bonded with her, additionally revealing that he was her father, since Diatrice only knew Marc as "Uncle Jake." Marc then had his friend Frenchie keep an eye on Diatrice while he went to rescue Marlene. During his final battle against Sun King, Marc found strength in his love for Diatrice to defeat the villain.

Diatrice's life was again threatened by the Société des Sadiques, whose leader Ernst wanted to indoctrinate Moon Knight, and threatened to have Diatrice killed if he didn't do as asked. After Moon Knight killed Ernst, he joined forces with the redeemed Sun King to attack the base of operations of the Société to take them down before they could hurt Diatrice. When he returned home briefly before going into battle, Diatrice handed Marc a drawing called "Diatrice and Daddy" depicting her as a grownup superhero called "Moon Girl" and older versions of her father and mother, impressing him. After her father finally defeated the Société and The Truth, Diatrice would be around him and her mother Marlene.

Sometime later, the Egyptian moon god Khonshu sensed Mephisto's plans for world domination, leading Marc to leave his family and fight by his god's side to prevent that from coming true. When Khonshu succumbed to madness, however, Marc had to turn against him and help the Avengers defeat him. Following Khonshu's imprisonment, Marlene took Diatrice overseas and told Marc to leave them alone, claiming he was dangerous.

Digger

Digitek

Dinah Soar

Dionysus

Dirtnap

Discus
Discus (Tim Stuart) first appeared in Power Man #16 in December 1974, and was created by Tony Isabella and Billy Graham. The youngest son of Tyler Stuart, a warden at Seagate prison, Tim Stuart was employed by Justin Hammer and given a costume, jet-pack, and assorted weaponry. He took the name Discus, as his weapon of choice was a throwing disc; he usually carried disc-shaped flying blades. He is the younger brother of Stiletto.

DJ
DJ (Mark Sheppard) is a student at the Xavier Institute for Higher Learning who first appears in New X-Men: Academy X #2 (2004). Mark Sheppard was born in the fictional town of Bluewater Village as revealed in New X-Men. It was also revealed that his father was an alcoholic and his mother died when he was young. At the Xavier Institute for Higher Learning, DJ is a member of the Corsairs training squad who transfers to the Paragons squad. DJ is one of the many students depowered on M-Day, and later dies after a bus bombing. DJ possessed the ability to manipulate energy based on the type of music he was listening to.

D'Ken

D.O.A.

Doc Samson

Doctor Bong

Doctor Demonicus

Doctor Doom

Doctor Druid

Doctor Faustus

Doctor Minerva

Doctor Nemesis

Doctor Octopus

Doctor Spectrum

Kenji Obatu

Billy Roberts

Alice Nugent

Joseph Ledger

Unnamed Woman

Doctor Strange

Doctor Sun

Doctor Voodoo

Stacy Dolan
Stacy Dolan is the sometime girlfriend of Ghost Rider (Danny Ketch). First appearing in Ghost Rider (Vol. 3) #1 by Howard Mackie and Javier Saltares, she's the daughter of New York City police captain Arthur Dolan. Stacy grew up the childhood friends of Danny and Barbara Ketch and Jack D'Auria. As they grew older Stacy and Dan developed a romantic relationship. Stacy had aspirations to become a police officer like her father. Her life changed when she found out that Dan was in the hospital and his sister was in a coma. All she knew was they witnessed a murder and the sole suspect was the Ghost Rider. After that night Stacy noticed a pattern as familiar neighborhood faces had been murdered. Ghost Rider was involved in some way but she had not realized to what extent.

Over time, Stacy teamed up with Ghost Rider and the Midnight Sons during the event known as the Siege of Darkness where she acted as an unofficial representative of the NYPD and worked in conjunction with the Midnight Sons to help stop the growing threats of Lilith and Zarathos. It was during this battle that she discovered Dan was indeed the Ghost Rider.

Domino

Dominus
Dominus is a sentient super-computer, created by the alien Quists and sometimes controlled by Lucifer. Dominus first appeared in X-Men #21 (June 1966) entitled "From whence comes... Dominus?", by Roy Thomas and Jay Gavin. Dominus was the channel by which the alien race known as "The Arcane" conquered planet after planet. At Lucifer's command post, the Supreme One tells Lucifer that the time is ready for his true purpose- to deploy Dominus. Dominus and Lucifer were then temporarily defeated by Charles Xavier, who suffered a debilitating injury in the process. The X-Men would go on defeat Lucifer permanently.

Big Ben Donovan

Roger Dooley

Doom 2099

Doorman

Doop

Dopinder
Dopinder is a fictional cab driver appearing in the X-Men film series. The character, created by Rhett Reese and Paul Wernick, first appeared in Deadpool where he was portrayed by Karan Soni. He reappears in Deadpool 2.

Dopinder is a man of Indian descent who makes a living as a taxi cab driver. One day, he picks up Deadpool who, uncomfortable with sitting in the back seat, moves to the front and starts a conversation with Dopinder about where he is going and why. The two end up forming an unusual friendship as Dopinder seems to bluntly accept Deadpool's violent lifestyle. Dopinder was initially engaged to a woman named Gita who, unfortunately for Dopinder, is in love with his cousin Bandhu who Dopinder describes as being "as dishonorable as he is attractive." At Deadpool's somewhat indirect suggestion, Dopinder kidnaps Bandhu and ties him up in the trunk of his taxi cab. An amused Deadpool supports Dopinder's action while feigning condemnation, as he was riding with Colossus and Negasonic Teenage Warhead at the time, covertly advising Dopinder to kill his competition. Later, distracted by a cellphone call from Deadpool, Dopinder stops his cab suddenly and is rear-ended by another vehicle, crushing the trunk and causing Bandhu to scream in pain.

In the film's sequel, Dopinder continues driving Deadpool to his various contracts and missions while hoping to become a contract killer himself (confirming that he managed to successfully yet indirectly kill Bandhu) as he's envious of Deadpool's lifestyle. He begins working as a janitor at Sister Margaret's School for Wayward Children, but Deadpool and Weasel refuse to have him join in any missions. Dopinder continues showing up to aid Deadpool, but chickens out upon seeing Juggernaut. Dopinder soon returns to use his taxi to kill the mutant-hating Essex Center headmaster, getting his first thrill from actually killing somebody on purpose.

Dorma

Dormammu

Doughboy

Dracula

Dragon Lord

Dragon Man
Dragon Man is a fictional character appearing in American comic books published by Marvel Comics.

Dragon Man is an android built by Professor Gregson Gilbert of Empire State University as an experiment. Gregson hoped to find a way to bring it to life. He could not find a way to do this until the alchemist Diablo arrived and brought it to life under his partial control using his supernatural powers. However, Dragon Man broke his control and attempted to kill Diablo.

Although Dragon Man is slow-minded to the point that he is incapable of speech, he understands orders given by Diablo and is a determined foe of the Fantastic Four (although the creature has always displayed a King Kong-like affection towards Sue Richards). Dragon Man is not especially malicious, although he is easily manipulated and provoked to violence.

After his first activation, Dragon Man was later revived. He encountered Medusa and Gorgon, and fought the Thing and Human Torch.

Dragon Man was later studied by Hank Pym at his laboratory. He was restored to life again by Diablo and was defeated by Pym as Goliath and escaped. Dragon Man battled Hercules and the Avengers destroyed Diablo's army of Dragon Men.

Dragon Man was once found by the original X-Men and was considered an unofficial mascot of sorts. After a period of time on the team where he developed a deep affection for Jean Grey, Dragon Man had to be released to the creature-filled island known in the Marvel Universe as Monster Island.

Dragon Man was reclaimed by Professor Gregson Gilbert and sent by Lemuel Dorcas to attack Namor. It was next used by Gregory Gideon to attack the Fantastic Four. Dragon Man was then sent by Machinesmith to attack Captain America. He became the mount for the extra-dimensional dragon rider Ral Dorn. Dragon Man then fought Hulk and Kate Waynesboro when it was under the control of Ringmaster and the Circus of Crime.

Dragon Man encountered the child superheroes called Power Pack. Gregson Gilbert later attempted to replicate the creation of the Dragon Man without the addition of alchemical interruptions, and this time succeeded. He created a number of androids based on other legendary creatures. These androids were defeated by Power Pack, and Gilbert and Dragon Man go to work at Disneyland.

Dragon Man was used as a servant of Aron the Rogue Watcher.

He faced Spider-Man during the Acts of Vengeance, when he was unleashed on him by Wizard.

In addition to his servitude to Diablo, Dragon Man has served Super-Adaptoid and was also a member of the New Enforcers. In The Spectacular Spider-Man #235-6, Roxxon Oil sprung him from a government containment facility to capture and dissect him to create robotic super-soldiers based on Dragon Man's powers. He was freed by Ben Reilly.

Dragon Man showed up in Africa under the influence of mad scientist Eric Pain. Though the creature was under a full rage, he ended up defeated once more by both superheroes. Afterwards, he resurfaced in Beyond!, destroying an Avengers Quinjet the group was using to escape.

During the Civil War storyline, he was spotted at the funeral of Stilt-Man. After poisoning the guests, the Punisher blew up the bar in which the wake had been held. He was later seen being arrested by S.H.I.E.L.D. agents.

Alyosha Kraven later began collecting a zoo of animal-themed superhumans, including Bushmaster, Gargoyle, Tiger Shark, Kangaroo, Aragorn, Vulture, Mongoose, Man-Bull, Swarm, Mandrill, Grizzly, Frog-Man, and Rhino. In the end, the Punisher managed to sabotage this zoo; though Kraven himself escaped to the Savage Land.

In Avengers: The Initiative #8, Dragon Man had been captured by the trainee heroes, having been attracted to Komodo.

In Nova, Dragon Man was seen battling the newly revived Nova Corps consisting of Qubit, Fraktur, Tracel, Morrow, Irani, and Robbie Rider. He was subdued by the Corps using a gravimetric net.

At one point, Dragon Man had been placed in the Negative Zone, and like most of the other prisoners, was conscripted into service when Blastaar attacked the prison. When the Shadow Initiative was sent in to liberate the prison, Blastaar sent Dragon Man against them. However, Komodo was able to use Dragon Man's attraction to her to convince him to switch sides.

Following this, Dragon seemingly reforms, as he, Artie and Leech were seen at Franklin Richards' birthday party.

Dragon Man has since been upgraded by Valeria Richards and joined Reed Richards' Future Foundation. Valeria used her talents to upgrade Dragon Man to have super-intellect and have the power of human speech. Dragon Man would become an adopted member of the Future Foundation and guardian of the gifted children in that program.

As part of the Marvel NOW! event, Dragon Man created the Thing Rings for Darla Deering to wear which enables her to become Miss Thing upon some particles enabling her to transform into her Thing Exoskeleton (which was also modified by Dragon Man).

Dragon Man in other media
 Dragon Man appears in The New Fantastic Four. This version is an android built for good by Professor Gilbert before its controls are stolen by his assistant George. With help from Gilbert, the Fantastic Four use cold temperatures to stop Dragon Man.
 Dragon Man appears in the Fantastic Four: World's Greatest Heroes episode "Frightful" as a member of the Wizard's Frightful Four and resembles an anthropomorphic dragon with wings on his arms.
 Dragon Man appears in Ultimate Spider-Man as a creation of Doctor Octopus's.
 Dragon Man appears in Spider-Man: Web of Fire.
 Dragon Man appears in Fantastic Four (1997).
 Dragon Man appears as a boss in Fantastic Four (2005).
 Dragon Man appears as a mini-boss in Marvel: Ultimate Alliance.
 Dragon Man appears in Marvel Heroes.
 Dragon Man appears in Marvel Contest of Champions.
 Dragon Man received several action figures released by Toy Biz. The character was included in Fantastic Four series 2 (1995), Fantastic Four Metal Mania (1995), Marvel Universe (1997), and Fantastic Four Classics series 2 (2007).
 Dragon Man received an action figure from HeroClix (2021).

Dragon of the Moon
The Dragon of the Moon is a malevolent entity that has been a foe of both the Defenders and the Eternals. The Dragon of the Moon first appeared in The Defenders #138–139 (December 1984–January 1985), and was created by Peter B. Gillis and Don Perlin. The Dragon's exact origins are unrevealed, however it does claim to know some of the Elders of the Universe. It has claimed to kill the inhabitants of Titan before the Eternals inhabited it. It has also claimed that the Lords of Light once took away his freedom. It has visited the Earth several times. The first time, it tried to take over the Earth, but was apparently repulsed by the Eternal known as Interloper. The Dragon of the Moon possesses control over massive amounts of cosmic and mystical forces, presumably on at least a global scale. It is immortal. Its strength is increased on the mortal plane as the host of the Dragon of the Moon succumbs further and further to the Dragon's influence.

Dragonfly
Dragonfly first appeared in X-Men #94-95 (August–October 1975), and was created by Chris Claremont and Len Wein.  Veronica Dultry is endowed with superhuman powers by Maggia scientists to serve the crime lord Count Nefaria as a member of the original Ani-Men. The Ani-Men take control of the NORAD base at Mount Valhalla, but are defeated by the X-Men, and imprisoned in the mutant research complex at Muir Island. She escapes shortly after when Erik the Red breaks into the complex.

She is later abducted by the alien the Stranger to his laboratory world, where she and other abductees are manipulated by the Overmind into battling Quasar. After she returns to Earth, she mutates further due to the Stranger's experiments, but Ant-Man aids her in returning to her normal appearance.

Dragonfly in other media
Dragonfly appears in The Avengers: United They Stand episode "Command Decision", voiced by Susan Roman. This version is a member of Baron Helmut Zemo's Masters of Evil.

Dragoness
A member of the Mutant Liberation Front.

Carlton Drake

Carlton Drake is a fictional character appearing in Marvel Comics. The character, created by David Michelinie and Todd McFarlane, first appeared in The Amazing Spider-Man #298 (March 1988). He is the Life Foundation's leader who is constantly at odds with Spider-Man and Eddie Brock.

Drake hires Chance to steal European armaments. His men transport Chance to his survivalist facility Sanctum Maximus, and demand the secrets of Chance's suit. Spider-Man arrives to rescue Chance and the two destroy the facility while Drake escapes via helicopter. Drake next teams up with the foreign assassin Chakane in a plot to use Protectors, enhanced and mindless mercenaries, for the assassination of Symkaria's king. The Protectors are defeated by Spider-Man, Paladin and Silver Sable but Drake's resources prevent any prosecution. Afterwards, Drake used the Tri-Sentinel for his clientele's protection. While performing a "field test" against Spider-Man and Nova, the Tri-Sentinel is unresponsive to his controls and went on a rampage. With nothing else to lose, Drake has his men gather all the data and once again evade capture. Drake briefly teams up with Justin Hammer and Jonas Hale in an effort to steal superpowers for their own nefarious purposes, but are stopped by Spider-Man and the New Warriors.

Drake uses the Venom symbiote to create five new symbiote "children" (Scream, Phage, Agony, Lasher and Riot) which he bonds to his employees. However, his symbiote enforcers are defeated by Spider-Man and Brock, forcing Drake to once again flee while realizing that web-slinger is more troublesome than he believed. Drake next funds a project in an attempt to create a race of arachnids and cure his cancer with Roland Treece and Orwell Taylor as co-conspirators. Drake is eventually injected with a serum which transforms himself into the Man-Spider. He lays waste to the entire facility, killing many of his former employees. However, the combined efforts of Spider-Man, Venom and The Jury send him falling beneath the facility. Drake later wakes up as a noticeably younger-looking human, swearing revenge against the ones who defeated him.

Years later, Drake is Senator Arthur Krane's campaign manager to inform about the threats symbiotes cause. It is strongly implied that he wants to use his position in an effort to study symbiotes more.

Carlton Drake's powers and abilities
Carlton Drake is average man but has an above average knowledge of symbiotes. His Man-Spider form has arachnid-like superhuman strength and durability as well as acidic saliva.

Carlton Drake in other media 
Carlton Drake appears in Venom (2018), portrayed by Riz Ahmed. This version is the Life Foundation's vainglorious, egocentric founder and CEO who started out as a biochemist. After one of his company's spaceships discovers several symbiotes, Drake has the symbiotes brought to Earth to run experiments with. However, two of the symbiotes die due to failed bonding attempts, the Venom symbiote escapes and successfully bonds with Eddie Brock, and Drake himself bonds with the Riot symbiote. Together, they attempt to bring more symbiotes to Earth, only to be killed by Brock and Venom.

Frank Drake

Frank Drake is a fictional character, a direct descendant of Count Dracula (via a marriage from before he became a vampire). The character first appeared in Tomb of Dracula #1 and was created by Gene Colan and Gerry Conway.

Frank Drake is a former millionaire who had squandered his inheritance and had nothing more than an ancestral castle in Transylvania. Planning to sell it, he and his friends travel to the castle, and discover Dracula's skeleton. They accidentally resurrect him, and Drake narrowly escapes death. Drake eventually relocates to London.

Broke and in despair, Drake attempts to commit suicide but was saved by Rachel van Helsing and Taj Nital, two vampire hunters. The two, along with Quincy Harker, were dedicated to killing Dracula and his vampiric followers. Drake joins the group under van Helsing and Harker's tutelage. Drake soon encounters Blade, with whom Drake constantly clashed but would eventually befriend. Later, Drake and Brother Voodoo battle zombies sent by Dracula. Drake, Blade, Van Helsing, Harker, and Harold H. Harold help Dracula battle Doctor Sun.

Quincy Harker eventually made the ultimate sacrifice by detonating a bomb concealed in his wheelchair which destroyed him, Dracula, and much of the castle in which they met for the last time. Drake and Van Helsing discovered Harker's wheelchair, and the supposed death of Dracula. Quincy's final letter to Rachel and Frank urged the two of them to grow closer together and discover what they all knew was there all the time. As a result, Frank and Rachel did attempt a romance but due to Frank's later account, Rachel was an empty shell without Dracula to fight and the two shortly parted but not without deep regrets. Rachel would eventually be turned into a vampire herself and die mercifully at the hands of X-Man Wolverine.

Frank, upon hearing of Rachel's death realizes that Dracula is back and teams up with Blade, Hannibal King, and Doctor Strange to fight his return from the grave. Drake, King, Blade and Strange battled Dracula and the Darkholders, and were responsible for casting the Montesi Formula which destroyed Dracula and all vampires and banished vampirism from earth. Drake, King (now cured of vampirism and the only vampire to survive the Montesi spell), and Blade decided to remain together and become private investigators, founding the firm of King, Drake, and Blade (aka Borderline Investigations). They would investigate any number of strange and not so strange cases, including a battle with the Darkholders. In their first appearance, Doctor Strange helped them battle the Darkholders.

Drake, wishing for a more normal life, eventually left the firm. Apparently, the friendship between King, Drake, and Blade had soured. Drake moved to Washington D.C. and married Marlene McKenna, a woman he had met sometime after parting ways with Rachel. During this time, Marlene seemed to come under the power of Dracula and scarred her face to resemble Rachel's facial scars. Drake, reluctantly called a hostile Blade and the two, assisted by Blade's friend Katinka, eventually aborted Dracula's resurrection again. This resulted in Blade's nervous breakdown and institutionalization. Drake, determined to live a normal life with Marlene, declined an invitation from Katinka, to stay in touch. Katinka suspected that things were only beginning.

With the weakening of the Montesi spell, Dr. Strange realized that not only were vampires returning, but also an increased occurrence of supernatural invasions. On this realization, Strange arranged for the release of Blade and for Drake (whose wife Marlene had again mysteriously fallen ill), to meet him and King back at their old Borderline offices where King, who had been running the business by himself had to eventually close shop due to the return of his vampirism. None of them too glad to see the other, but each having their reasons for getting back together, they form the Nightstalkers; by day, they are private investigators, by night, they fight any number of supernatural villains. Drake, armed with an anti-supernatural nanotech gun named Linda (after Linda Blair of The Exorcist) fights alongside Blade and King against various occult enemies. 'Linda' was engineered from Frank's blue prints by 'Silcon' Valle, a computer technician at M.I.T.

In their first mission, the Nightstalkers are hired by Lilith to kill the second Ghost Rider and John Blaze, and battled Meatmarket. Ghost Rider and Blaze then joined the Nightstalkers, Strange, and the Darkhold Redeemers in battling Lilith and her Lilin. The Nightstalkers also battled HYDRA's DOA. Alongside the Punisher, the Nightstalkers battled Shiv and Casim. The Nightstalkers, with Ghost Rider, battled Stonecold. The Nightstalkers next battled Morbius, and battled Stonecold again.

The Lilin are children of Lilith, an ancient demonic being. The Nightstalker's involvement with her brings them into the group known as the Midnight Sons. This includes Dan Ketch (Ghost Rider), Michael Badilino (Vengeance), John Blaze (A previous incarnation of Ghost Rider), Morbius, the Living Vampire and Victoria Montesi and her team dubbed "The Darkhold Redeemers". Doctor Strange offered frequent guidance to the group, and they also teamed with other heroes like Spider-Man. In one of the many adventures involving this team, Drake helps deal with Blade, who temporarily goes insane due to the use of the Darkhold.

Eventually, they fight against the Atlantean vampire Varnae in which Drake overloads Linda causing an explosion that is thought to destroy him and Varnae (King having attempted to sacrifice himself by plunging a metal stake through his heart while fighting off vampire-lord Varnae's mental control). Blade escapes believing them to be dead but eventually runs into King in New Orleans who explains that Drake also survived but was left horribly scarred and crippled in both body and mind and would probably remain only a shell of his former self.

Frank Drake is a capable hand-to-hand combatant, and an experienced marksman. He has been known to carry conventional handguns.  He also possesses a nano-tech weapon capable of disrupting occult energies, which he calls Linda.

Frank Drake in other media

Film
 Frank Drake appears in Dracula: Sovereign of the Damned, voiced by Keiichi Noda in Japanese and by Dan Woren in English.
 Dracula uses the cover name of Drake in Blade: Trinity.

Damon Dran

Drax the Destroyer

Dreadface
Dreadface is a character appearing in American comic books in Marvel Comics. The character, created by Tom DeFalco and Paul Ryan, first appeared in Fantastic Four vol. 1 #359 (December 1991). He is a Symbiote and a foe of the Fantastic Four.

Dreadface in other media
Dreadface appears in Spider-Man as a member of a Klyntar invasion force who infects most of the Avengers, Cloak and Dagger, and the Guardians of the Galaxy before the symbiotes are eventually defeated by Spider-Man and Max Modell using the Anti-Venom symbiote with help from May Parker and Moon Knight.

Dreadknight

Dreadnought

Dreaming Celestial
The Dreaming Celestial (Tiamut the Communicator) is a Celestial that first appeared in The Eternals #18 (December 1977). Created by Jack Kirby, his origins were added in stories written by others and published decades later. Within the context of the stories, the Dreaming Celestial is a renegade Celestial named Tiamut. He claims that during the Second Host to visit Earth, he resisted the Host's decision to not turn the Earth over to the Horde and was exiled and his spirit trapped in the "Vial". This remains sealed under the Diablo Range in California until it is discovered by Ghaur who temporarily releases the Dreaming Celestial's power. He is reawakened by the Deviants and acts as a beacon for the Horde as he proceeds to "judge" Earth. This leads to his confrontation with Fulcrum and his ascending from the state of being a Celestial.

Wanting to get behind the depowerment of most of the mutants, the High Evolutionary provided Magneto with a suit to replicate his powers so that he can provide a diversion for the High Evolutionary to obtain an item that is inside the Dreaming Celestial.

Fictional character biography 
Tiamut the Communicator whose function was to alert the Fulcrum of the findings of the Celestials during planetary examinations and to send a signal to the Horde to collect the planet's aggregate life-force.

Tiamut was one of the ten members of the First Celestial Host when it visited Earth one million years ago. During this visit, Tiamut personally created the Eternal Makkari, designing him for speed and with several other interesting features in his DNA structure. It is said by some that the Deviant conqueror known as Lord Tantalus from the planet Arqa was created more than 25,000 years ago by the Dreaming Celestial but this has not been confirmed.

During the Second Celestial Host, the Deviants were the dominant force on Earth, and Tiamut was ready to call the Horde to begin the harvesting of the planet. However, Arishem had that order canceled, and had many of the Deviants culled, while not touching the other species. As this was a violation of their protocol, Tiamut deemed Arishem to be malfunctioning and tried to assume command by attacking Arishem. Although Tiamut defeated Arishem, he was then attacked by four other Celestials who had been working with Arishem, and he was imprisoned underneath the mountains. Why they did this though, is still not truly clear, and mention must be made of the fact that this account of events was given by the Dreaming Celestial itself and has not yet been rebutted or verified. It should also be noted that, by giving this account to Makkari, the Dreaming Celestial contradicted his previous claim that he could not explain why the other Celestials had put him to sleep because the reason involved concepts for which Makkeri had no referent.

It was after being defeated and imprisoned that Tiamut's true name was supposedly obliterated forever so that he would only be spoken of as the Dreaming Celestial.

One of the Exterminators killed the Dreaming Celestial during their attempt to invade the Multiverse.

Powers and abilities 
Tiamut the Communicator possess the power of cosmic energy control with an unknown upper limit. His armour is able to easily withstand strikes from nuclear warheads and planetary impacts. Tiamut seems to be one of the most powerful Celestials as Galactus feared it and Uatu the Watcher could not see anything when it awoke.

Tiamut in other media
Tiamut appears in the live-action Marvel Cinematic Universe film Eternals. In the film, the reversal of the Blip resulted in Earth reaching the necessary population for Tiamut to emerge from the planet. However, his emergence is prevented by the Eternals.

Dreamqueen
The Dreamqueen is the daughter of a succubus named Zhilla Char, and Nightmare, ruler of the Dream Dimension. The character first appeared in Alpha Flight #57 (April 1988). The character was created by Bill Mantlo and Jim Lee.

Her birth killed her mother, and gave the Dreamqueen all her memories. She was born in a similar "dream dimension" of her own called Liveworld, of which she is the ruler. It was to this dimension that the fetus of Laura Dean instinctively sent her unborn twin sister, Goblyn. As the autistic Laura grew up, she discovered that she was able to switch places in Liveworld with her sister.  After encountering Alpha Flight, Goblyn and Laura were admitted into Beta Flight under the mis-belief that they were one and the same person. She possesses a gifted intelligence, is entirely self-educated in the study of sorcery, and gains her powers through the manipulation of the forces of magic.

Igor Drenkov
Igor Drenkov is a minor character appearing in Marvel Comics. He was created by Stan Lee and Jack Kirby, and first appeared in Incredible Hulk #1 (May 1962). He is a colleague of Bruce Banner / Hulk. A spy sent to America to learn gamma secrets for the Soviet Union, Drenkov helped Banner with the gamma bomb. Drenkov is asked to postpone the test when Rick Jones drove out on the field but continued anyway with the gamma bomb explosion which resulted in the Hulk's existence. Drenkov searched for the gamma formula but the Hulk intercepted him. Drenkov is imprisoned but alerts the Gargoyle of the Hulk. Drenkov is later driven insane by nightmares of his decisions, and works with the Presence but is betrayed and transformed into a gamma monster, fighting the Winter Guard; he eats the Crimson Dynamo which angered Darkstar who destroyed Drenkov.

Igor Drenkov in other media
 Igor Drenkov appeared in The Marvel Super Heroes. 
 A variation of Igor Drenkov appears in the Avengers Assemble episode "Dehulked", voiced by Andre Sogliuzzo. This version is Bruce Banner's presumed dead partner following the gamma bomb explosion that was behind the Hulk and a tech pirate who uses a gamma-draining exosuit and the Steelcorps as his robotic enforcers. He successfully depowers the Hulk back into Banner before confronting the Avengers, during which he reveals his motives and jealousy towards his former colleague. Drenkov is initially defeated, but captures and steals Banner's gamma radiation to empower himself. He defeats the Avengers, but Banner uses more gamma radiation to transform back into the Hulk and depower Drenkov.

Dredmund Druid

Druig

Dryad

D'Spayre

Michael Duffy

Sgt. Michael "Mike" Duffy is a fictional character in Marvel Comics. The character, created by Joe Simon and Jack Kirby, first appeared in Captain America Comics #1 (March 1941).

Michael Duffy was the superior of Steve Rogers and James Barnes who were secretly Captain America and Bucky. He had a short temper and was always getting after his soldiers for "goldbricking". He was always picking on Rogers and Barnes for not being heroes, an ironic claim as he was unaware of their dual identities. He had nearly put two and two together, but would later deny the possibility. At one point, Duffy showed remorse when he thought that Rogers and Barnes had died in a Japanese air raid, only to go back to berating them when he found out they were alive. He also had a crush on Betsy Ross though this was retconned to show that he had a lover overseas named Flo. While out on a mission, Duffy and several soldiers were caught in an explosion. He survived and was recuperating in a hospital. Due to his lack of appearances afterwards, it's implied that he stayed in bed for the remainder of the war. Years later, Rogers would visit Arlington National Cemetery to see his former commander's grave stone and reminisce on old times.

Michael Duffy in other media
Michael Duffy appears in the Marvel Cinematic Universe films Captain America: The First Avenger and Captain America: The Winter Soldier, portrayed by Damon J. Driver. This version is a drill sergeant who is not comically temperamental nor mean-spirited towards Steve Rogers.

Dum-Dum Dugan

Fred Duncan

Frederick Amos "Fred" Duncan is a fictional government liaison for the X-Men in Marvel Comics. The character, created by Stan Lee and Jack Kirby, first appeared in X-Men #2 (November 1963).

Fred Duncan was an agent with the FBI. Along with fellow agent Bolivar Trask, Duncan was asked by his superiors on how to handle the "mutant threat". While Trask felt that America should fear them, Duncan thought it was best to work alongside them. Duncan's idea was approved causing tension between him and Trask to the point that the latter suspected him to be a mutant as well. He then teamed up with Wolverine to battle Lyle Doome who went by the name Virus.

He met with Professor Charles Xavier and became the FBI's federal liaison with the X-Men. He was then provided a special headband so that he can communicate with Xavier whenever it was necessary. He helped Xavier with the eventual recruitment of Scott Summers. As a member of the Xavier Underground, a network of mutant supporters, Duncan maintained mutant criminal records and stockpiled weapons and technology from X-Men foes.

Duncan later helped the X-Men once again when the team had to break into the Pentagon to delete the files they had about their identities. Henry Peter Gyrich suspected that Duncan had something to do with the files being deleted and demanded that he somehow get them back (the Department of Mutant Affairs answered to Gyrich's Project Wideawake), but Duncan instead resigned. Duncan then decided to write a tell-all book about his time working with the mutants. After Duncan's death, Carl Denti, an aspiring agent, takes the files, weapons, and technology for himself and assumes the name X-Cutioner, with the proclaimed mission of killing any mutant that has killed other people first.

Fred Duncan in other media
While Duncan has not appeared in any other media, a character similar in purpose identified as Man in Black Suit appears in X-Men: First Class played by Oliver Platt. He takes on Xavier and his students for the CIA and monitors them for future missions. He is killed later on by Azazel.

Dusk

Negative Zone

Peter Parker

Cassie St. Commons

Dust

Dweller-in-Darkness

Dyna-Mite

Dyna-Mite (Roger Aubrey), subsequently known as Destroyer, was a member of the Crusaders. The character first appeared as Dyna-Mite in The Invaders #14–15 (March–April 1977). He also appears as Dyna-Mite in The Invaders #18–23 (July–December 1977). Aubrey, a close friend of the hero Brian Falsworth, one of the Union Jacks, supported peace between Germany and Britain. Around 1938, the pair went on a German tour. War began and the two quickly discovered the evils of the Nazis. Both were thrown in prison. Falsworth's connections helped him but he could not help Aubrey, who was taken away. German scientists experimented upon Aubrey, while Falsworth became the 'Destroyer', fighting a guerrilla war against Germany. Aubrey is shrunk to just  in height, but manages to keep the strength of a full size man. He was brainwashed and sent to fight the Allies. He was eventually captured and reprogrammed. He joins the superhero team, the Crusaders, as Dyna-Mite. It was later revealed that Roger and Brian were lovers.

Dynamic Man 
Dynamic Man is a fictional comic book superhero appearing in American comic books published by Marvel Comics. The superhero was first published by Timely Comics, the forerunner of Marvel Comics during the period known to fans and historians as the Golden Age of Comic Books.

He was created by Daniel Peters  and first appeared in Mystic Comics #1 (March 1940). He made his first modern age appearance in The Twelve.

Dynamic Man started out as an android created by the brilliant scientist Professor Goettler. However, when the professor threw the switch to bring life to Dynamic Man, the excitement was too much for him, and he died.  Dynamic Man resolves to use his amazing powers for the betterment of humanity, and flies away to civilization. He became an F.B.I. agent using the alias Curt Cowan.  When not working for the F.B.I., he would don a costume and become the superhero Dynamic Man.

References

Marvel Comics characters: D, List of